Honeysuckles are arching shrubs or twining vines in the genus Lonicera of the family Caprifoliaceae, native to northern latitudes in North America and Eurasia. Approximately 180 species of honeysuckle have been identified in both continents. Widely known species include Lonicera periclymenum (common honeysuckle or woodbine), Lonicera japonica (Japanese honeysuckle, white honeysuckle, or Chinese honeysuckle) and Lonicera sempervirens (coral honeysuckle, trumpet honeysuckle, or woodbine honeysuckle). L. japonica is an aggressive, highly invasive species considered a significant pest on the continents of North America, Europe, South America, Australia, and Africa.

Some species are highly fragrant and colorful, so are cultivated as ornamental garden plants. In North America, hummingbirds are attracted to the flowers, especially L. sempervirens and L. ciliosa (orange honeysuckle). Honeysuckle derives its name from the edible sweet nectar obtainable from its tubular flowers. The name Lonicera stems from Adam Lonicer, a Renaissance botanist.

Description

Most species of Lonicera are hardy twining climbers, with a minority of shrubby habit. Some species (including Lonicera hildebrandiana from the Himalayan foothills and L. etrusca from the Mediterranean) are tender and can only be grown outside in subtropical zones. The leaves are opposite, simple oval, 1–10 cm long; most are deciduous but some are evergreen.

Many of the species have sweetly scented, bilaterally symmetrical flowers that produce a sweet, edible nectar, and most flowers are borne in clusters of two (leading to the common name of "twinberry" for certain North American species). Both shrubby and vining sorts have strongly fibrous stems which have been used for binding and textiles.

The fruit is a red, blue or black spherical or elongated berry containing several seeds; in most species the berries are mildly poisonous, but in a few (notably Lonicera caerulea) they are edible and grown for home use and commerce. Most honeysuckle berries are attractive to wildlife, which has led to species such as L. japonica and L. maackii spreading invasively outside of their home ranges. Many species of Lonicera are eaten by the larvae of some Lepidoptera species—see a list of Lepidoptera that feed on honeysuckles.

Invasive species
The spread of L. japonica in North America began in the United States in 1806, when it was widely cultivated by the 1860s. It was first discovered in Canada in Ontario forests in 1976, and became invasive by 2007. L. japonica was introduced in Australia between 1820-40.

Several species of honeysuckle have become invasive when introduced outside their native range, particularly in North America, Europe, South America, Australia, and Africa.  Invasive species include L. japonica, L. maackii, L. morrowii, L. tatarica, and the hybrid between the last two, L. × bella.

Cultivation
Honeysuckles are valued as garden plants, for their ability to cover unsightly walls and outbuildings, their profuse tubular flowers in early summer, and the intense fragrance of many varieties. The hardy climbing types need their roots in shade, and their flowering tops in sunlight or very light shade. Varieties need to be chosen with care, as they can become substantial. Cultivars of the dense, small-leaved L. nitida are used as low, narrow hedges.

The following hybrids have gained the Royal Horticultural Society's Award of Garden Merit: 

L. × heckrottii 'Gold Flame' 
L. ‘Mandarin’ 
L. × purpusii 'Winter Beauty' 
L. × tellmanniana 

Other cultivars are dealt with under their species names.

The honeysuckle species Lonicera japonica is grown as a commercial crop for traditional Chinese medicine use.

Phytochemicals and sensory effects
Honeysuckle is renowned for its colorful, fragrant flowers and variously colored fruit, indicating the presence of complex phytochemicals underlying these properties. Component analyses of berries from 27 different cultivars and 3 genotypes of edible honeysuckle (Lonicera caerulea var. kamtschatica) showed the presence of iridoids, anthocyanins, flavonols, flavanonols, flavones, flavan-3-ols, and phenolic acids. While sugars determine the level of sweetness in the berries, organic acids and polyphenols are responsible for the sour taste and tartness. Some 51 of the same compounds in berries are found in flowers, although the proportions of these compounds varied among cultivars studied.

Interaction with other species
Many insects in the order Lepidoptera visit honeysuckles as a food source. An example of this is the moth Deilephila elpenor. This nocturnal species of moth is especially attracted to honeysuckles, and they visit the flowers at night to feed on their nectar.

Selected species
Some 180 species of Lonicera are documented.

Lonicera acuminata or Lonicera pampaninii – fragrant grove honeysuckle or vine honeysuckle
Lonicera albiflora – white honeysuckle
Lonicera alpigena – alpine honeysuckle
Lonicera altmannii
Lonicera × americana
Lonicera angustifolia
Lonicera anisocalyx
Lonicera arborea
Lonicera arizonica – Arizona honeysuckle
Lonicera × bella – Bell's honeysuckle or showy fly honeysuckle
Lonicera biflora
Lonicera bournei
Lonicera brevisepala
Lonicera buchananii
Lonicera buddleioides
Lonicera caerulea – blue-berried honeysuckle
Lonicera calcarata
Lonicera calvescens
Lonicera canadensis – Canada fly honeysuckle, American fly honeysuckle
Lonicera caprifolium – goat-leaf honeysuckle, perfoliate honeysuckle
Lonicera carnosifolis
Lonicera cerviculata
Lonicera chrysantha – Chrysantha honeysuckle
Lonicera ciliosa – orange honeysuckle
Lonicera ciliosissima
Lonicera cinerea
Lonicera codonantha
Lonicera confusa
Lonicera conjugialis – purpleflower honeysuckle
Lonicera crassifolia
Lonicera cyanocarpa
Lonicera dasystyla – Tonkinese honeysuckle
Lonicera dioica – limber honeysuckle
Lonicera elisae
Lonicera etrusca – Etruscan honeysuckle
Lonicera fargesii
Lonicera ferdinandii
Lonicera ferruginea
Lonicera flava – yellow honeysuckle
Lonicera fragilis
Lonicera fragrantissima – winter honeysuckle
Lonicera fulvotomentosa
Lonicera glutinosa
Lonicera graebneri
Lonicera gynochlamydea
Lonicera × heckrottii – Golden flame honeysuckle
Lonicera hellenica – Greek honeysuckle
Lonicera hemsleyana
Lonicera heterophylla
Lonicera hildebrandiana – giant Burmese honeysuckle
Lonicera hirsuta – hairy honeysuckle
Lonicera hispida
Lonicera hispidula – pink honeysuckle
Lonicera humilis
Lonicera hypoglauca
Lonicera hypoleuca
Lonicera implexa
Lonicera inconspicua
Lonicera inodora
Lonicera interrupta – Chaparral honeysuckle
Lonicera involucrata – bearberry honeysuckle
Lonicera japonica – Japanese honeysuckle
Lonicera jilongensis
Lonicera kansuensis
Lonicera kawakamii
Lonicera korolkowii – blueleaf honeysuckle
Lonicera lanceolata
Lonicera ligustrina
Lonicera litangensis
Lonicera longiflora
Lonicera longituba
Lonicera maackii – Amur honeysuckle
Lonicera macrantha
Lonicera macranthoides
Lonicera maximowiczii
Lonicera microphylla
Lonicera minuta
Lonicera minutifolia
Lonicera modesta
Lonicera morrowii – Morrow's honeysuckle
Lonicera mucronata
Lonicera myrtillus
Lonicera nervosa
Lonicera nigra – black-berried honeysuckle
Lonicera nitida – boxleaf honeysuckle
Lonicera nubium
Lonicera nummulariifolia
Lonicera oblata
Lonicera oblongifolia – swamp fly honeysuckle
Lonicera oiwakensis
Lonicera oreodoxa
Lonicera orientalis
Lonicera paradoxa
Lonicera periclymenum – (common) honeysuckle, European honeysuckle, or woodbine
Lonicera pileata – privet honeysuckle
Lonicera pilosa – Mexican honeysuckle
Lonicera praeflorens
Lonicera prostrata
Lonicera pyrenaica – Pyrenean honeysuckle
Lonicera quinquelocularis – translucent honeysuckle
Lonicera reticulata – grape honeysuckle
Lonicera retusa
Lonicera rhytidophylla
Lonicera rupicola
Lonicera ruprechtiana – Manchurian honeysuckle
Lonicera saccata
Lonicera schneideriana
Lonicera semenovii
Lonicera sempervirens – trumpet honeysuckle
Lonicera serreana
Lonicera setifera
Lonicera similis – var. delavayi – Delavay honeysuckle
Lonicera spinosa
Lonicera splendida – evergreen honeysuckle
Lonicera standishii – Standish's honeysuckle
Lonicera stephanocarpa
Lonicera subaequalis
Lonicera subhispida
Lonicera sublabiata
Lonicera subspicata – southern honeysuckle
Lonicera szechuanica
Lonicera taipeiensis
Lonicera tangutica
Lonicera tatarica – Tatarian honeysuckle
Lonicera tatarinowii
Lonicera tomentella
Lonicera tragophylla – Chinese honeysuckle
Lonicera tricalysioides
Lonicera trichogyne
Lonicera trichosantha
Lonicera tubuliflora
Lonicera utahensis – Utah honeysuckle
Lonicera villosa – mountain fly honeysuckle
Lonicera virgultorum
Lonicera webbiana
Lonicera xylosteum – fly woodbine
Lonicera yunnanensis
Several fossil species are known from the Miocene of Asia.

References

External links

 Flora of China: Lonicera species list
 

 
Taxa named by Carl Linnaeus